Pamela Davis is the name of:

 Pamela B. Davis, pediatric pulmonologist specializing in cystic fibrosis research.
 Pamela Ellen Davis, the founder, President, and CEO of the Nonprofits Insurance Alliance Group
 Pamela Meyer Davis, the Illinois hospital executive whose complaints lead to the investigation of Illinois Governor Rod Blagojevich

See also 

 Pamela Davies (1924–2009), British consultant paediatrician